Zinaida Dolotenko was a Soviet Ukrainian politician, born in Samhorodok, Smila Raion. She was elected to the Supreme Soviet of the Ukrainian SSR in 1947, representing the Kiev oblast. In 1951, the Central Committee of the Communist Party (Bolsheviks) of Ukraine recommended that she did not get re-elected, having been accused of low productivity of her agricultural brigade and being absent from meetings with her electorate. Moreover, in 1948 she had married a man seen as a former collaborator with the German occupation forces.

References

Second convocation members of the Verkhovna Rada of the Ukrainian Soviet Socialist Republic
20th-century Ukrainian women politicians
Soviet women in politics
People from Cherkasy Oblast
Possibly living people
Year of birth missing
Women members of the Verkhovna Rada